Favorsky is a surname. Notable people with the surname include:

Alexey Favorsky (1860–1945), Soviet and Russian chemist
Andrey Favorsky (1929–2005), Soviet equestrian
Lev Favorsky (1893–1969), Russian football player 
Vladimir Favorsky (1886–1964), Soviet artist and teacher